Cheung Tsing Highway is a highway of Route 3 between Cheung Tsing Tunnel and  on Tsing Yi Island, New Territories, Hong Kong. It was built as part of the Airport Core Programme together with the rest of Route 3 to provide a new highway link from North Western New Territories towards Hong Kong Island, and connects with Route 8 to provide access to the new Hong Kong International Airport.

It leads to Tsing Long Highway at North West Tsing Yi Interchange, and also connects to Lantau Link and  there. Its eastern end leads into Cheung Tsing Tunnel which is connected to Tsing Kwai Highway by Cheung Tsing Bridge.

In the early morning of 30 November 2018, a coach ferrying workers to Hong Kong International Airport collided with a broken-down taxi on the highway, killing six people – the coach driver, the taxi driver and four of the coach passengers. The coach driver was suspected to have fallen asleep, and had previously been involved in two other early-morning coach accidents in 2018. On 5 December, a memorial service for four of the victims was held at the accident site on the portion of Cheung Tsing Highway in Tsing Yi; the section of road was closed for two hours.

Interchanges

See also
Other highways in Kowloon and New Territories:
 Tsing Kwai Highway - Route 3
 West Kowloon Corridor - Route 5
 West Kowloon Highway - Route 3
 Tsing Long Highway - Route 3
 Tate's Cairn Highway - Route 2
 Tsing Sha Highway - Route 8

References

External links
 Highways in Kowloon 
 Google Maps of Cheung Tsing Highway

Expressways in Hong Kong
Route 3 (Hong Kong)
Route 8 (Hong Kong)
Tsing Yi
Extra areas operated by NT taxis
Viaducts in Hong Kong